Helena Svensson may refer to:

 Helena Lingham (born 1963), née Svensson, Swedish female curler
 Helena Svensson (golfer) (born 1979), Swedish golfer